The 2018 Arizona Rattlers season is the twenty-sixth season for the professional indoor football franchise and second in the Indoor Football League (IFL). Led by head coach Kevin Guy, the Rattlers play their home games at Talking Stick Resort Arena in Phoenix, Arizona.

Standings

Schedule

Regular season
Key:

Postseason

Staff

Final roster

References

Arizona Rattlers seasons
2018 Indoor Football League season
2018 in sports in Arizona